List of members of the Faroese Løgting in the period 2008 to 2011. The members were elected on 19 January 2008.

References

External links
Current members of the Løgting

 2008
2008 in the Faroe Islands
2009 in the Faroe Islands
2010 in the Faroe Islands
2011 in the Faroe Islands
2008–2011